Pydlpoly is a molecular dynamics simulation package which is a modified version of DL-POLY with a Python language interface. Pydlpoly is written by Rochus Schmid in Ruhr University Bochum, Germany.

Molecular dynamics software